John Gage Marvin (1815–1855) was an American lawyer, known as a legal bibliographer and figure of the history of California.

Early life
He was born at Le Raysville, Pennsylvania, and was educated at Wesleyan University in Connecticut. He then taught at Athens Academy, Athens, Pennsylvania from 1840. Three of his brothers attended the school, and a fourth worked the farm at Le Raysville.

In 1842 Marvin enrolled at Harvard Law School, from an address given as Towanda, Pennsylvania, and was there for four years, studying under Simon Greenleaf, Joseph Story and Charles Sumner. He graduated LL.B. in 1846, having served as Librarian. Marvin was the last beneficiary (1843–5) of a system of student librarians set up in 1830, who had a rent-free room in Dane Hall and some payment for their services to the Harvard Law Library.

In California
Towards the end of the Mexican–American War Marvin left his Boston law practice for the West Coast. He was with the Quartermaster Corps of the United States Army. He left the military in 1849, becoming editor of the Sonora Herald, and settling in Tuolumne County. Known locally as "Judge Marvin", he became a prominent citizen and part-time official.

Marvin laid out the settlement of Empire City on the Tuolumne River in Stanislaus County, California (at that time in Tuolumne County). It became the county seat of the new Stanislaus County in 1854, and an army supply center.

Marvin was the first California State Superintendent of Public Instruction. He came to San Jose at the end of 1850 to assume the position, finding nothing of which he could take charge. There was a legislative vacuum, which he proceeded to fill through the state legislature in stop-gap fashion, having consulted John C. Pelton who had recently set up a school in San Francisco. A clumsy and much amended school bill of 1851 was signed into law by Governor John McDougall, as California's first schools legislation.

Financial problems remained for public education, and Marvin had the state vote $50,000 in 1852. A second school law created a board of education. At the 1853 state Democratic convention, Paul K. Hubbs was nominated for Superintendent of Public Instruction ahead of Marvin. A John G. Marvin Elementary School is now in San Diego, founded in 1956.

Concurrently with his activities on behalf of education, Marvin associated with Jim Savage. At the end of the Mariposa War, he became quartermaster of the King's River Reservation, and business partner of Savage. Marvin was present at the quarrel between Savage and Walter Harvey in 1852, when Harvey shot Savage dead.

Death
He died in the Kingdom of Hawaii in 1855, or in some sources 1857.

Works
Marvin's best-known work is his Legal Bibliography, or A thesaurus of American, English, Irish, and Scotch law books (1847). It was preceded by an 1843 edition of a work on international law by Sir James Mackintosh, with reading list, and an 1846 Catalogue of the Harvard Law Library including recent accessions. The Bibliography is alphabetical by author, with a topical index, and includes evaluative comments on the works, drawing on numerous sources. Despite the impression given by its short title, the Bibliography was an attempt to integrate other legal works into the Anglo-American tradition.

Notes

Further reading
George Henry Tinkham (1921), History of Stanislaus County California: with biographical sketches of the leading men and women of the county who have been identified with its growth and development from the early days to the present (1921), archive.org
David F. Ferris (1963), Judge Marvin and the Founding of the California Public School System

External links
Events after the Mariposa Indian War, from Sam Ward in the Gold Rush (1861, 1949) by Samuel Ward

1815 births
1855 deaths
American bibliographers
Wesleyan University alumni
California Superintendents of Public Instruction
Harvard Law School alumni
19th-century American politicians
19th-century American lawyers